The 2009 FIBA Europe Under-18 Championship for Women Division C was the 7th edition of the Division C of the FIBA U18 Women's European Championship, the third tier of the European women's under-18 basketball championship. It was played in Malta from 14 to 18 July 2009. Luxembourg women's national under-18 basketball team won the tournament.

Participating teams

Final standings

References

2009
2009–10 in European women's basketball
FIBA U18
International basketball competitions hosted by Malta
FIBA